The 2016–17 NLEX Road Warriors season was the third season of the franchise in the Philippine Basketball Association (PBA).

Key dates

2016
October 30: The 2016 PBA draft took place at Midtown Atrium, Robinson Place Manila.

Draft picks

Special draft

Regular draft

Roster

Philippine Cup

Eliminations

Standings

Game log

|- style="background:#cfc;"
| 1
| November 25
| Alaska
| W 99–97 (OT) 
| Sean Anthony (21)
| Sean Anthony (14)
| Jonas Villanueva (5)
| Smart Araneta Coliseum
| 1–0

|- style="background:#fcc;"
| 2
| December 3
| Meralco
| L 93–106
| Sean Anthony (15)
| Anthony, Soyud (8)
| Garvo Lanete (7)
| Smart Araneta Coliseum
| 1–1
|- style="background:#fcc;"
| 3
| December 7
| Star
| L 75–99
| Lastimosa, J. Villanueva (11)
| Sean Anthony (6)
| four players (2)
| Mall of Asia Arena
| 1–2
|- style="background:#fcc;"
| 4
| December 14
| Blackwater
| L 85–96
| Carlo Lastimosa (23)
| Sean Anthony (11)
| Kevin Alas (8)
| Smart Araneta Coliseum
| 1–3
|- style="background:#fcc;"
| 5
| December 17
| San Miguel
| L 80–106
| Alas, Guinto, J. Villanueva (12)
| Sean Anthony (11)
| Jonas Villanueva (5)
| Xavier University Gym
| 1–4
|- style="background:#fcc;"
| 6
| December 23
| Rain or Shine
| L 97–107
| Sean Anthony (22)
| Sean Anthony (16)
| Jonas Villanueva (6)
| PhilSports Arena
| 1–5

|- style="background:#cfc;"
| 7
| January 7
| TNT
| W 110–98
| Carlo Lastimosa (22)
| Sean Anthony (13)
| Jonas Villanueva (7)
| Angeles University Foundation Sports Arena
| 2–5
|- style="background:#fcc;"
| 8
| January 13
| GlobalPort
| L 96–110
| Carlo Lastimosa (19)
| Raul Soyud (14)
| Carlo Lastimosa (6)
| Mall of Asia Arena
| 2–6
|- style="background:#fcc;"
| 9
| January 18
| Phoenix
| L 91–102
| Sean Anthony (23)
| Sean Anthony (8)
| Jonas Villanueva (4)
| Cuneta Astrodome
| 2–7
|- style="background:#fcc;"
| 10
| January 27
| Mahindra
| L 96–106
| Eric Camson (17)
| Bradwyn Guinto (7)
| Emman Monfort (5)
| Cuneta Astrodome
| 2–8
|- style="background:#fcc;"
| 11
| January 29
| Barangay Ginebra
| L 80–90
| Alas, E. Villanueva (14)
| Bradwyn Guinto (10)
| Camson, Lanete (3)
| Cuneta Astrodome
| 2–9

Commissioner's Cup

Eliminations

Standings

Game log

|- style="background:#fcc;"
| 1
| March 17
| Rain or Shine
| L 105–113
| Wayne Chism (27)
| Wayne Chism (21)
| Asi Taulava (4)
| Smart Araneta Coliseum
| 0–1
|- style="background:#fcc;"
| 2
| March 19
| Meralco
| L 84–91
| Wayne Chism (18)
| Wayne Chism (17)
| Sean Anthony (4)
| Smart Araneta Coliseum
| 0–2
|- style="background:#fcc;"
| 3
| March 24
| Mahindra
| L 81–89
| Wayne Chism (28)
| Wayne Chism (21)
| Jansen Rios (4)
| Smart Araneta Coliseum
| 0–3
|- style="background:#fcc;"
| 4
| March 31
| Star
| L 103–105
| Wayne Chism (33)
| Wayne Chism (19)
| Wayne Chism (5)
| Smart Araneta Coliseum
| 0–4

|- style="background:#fcc;"
| 5
| April 7
| TNT
| L 121–126 (OT)
| Wayne Chism (35)
| Wayne Chism (21)
| Jonas Villanueva (5)
| Mall of Asia Arena
| 0–5
|- style="background:#fcc;"
| 6
| April 12
| GlobalPort
| L 82–85
| Wayne Chism (29)
| Wayne Chism (14)
| Emman Monfort (4)
| Smart Araneta Coliseum
| 0–6
|- style="background:#fcc;"
| 7
| April 19
| Barangay Ginebra
| L 92–101
| Wayne Chism (16)
| Wayne Chism (8)
| Anthony, Monfort (3)
| Cuneta Astrodome
| 0–7
|- style="text-align:center;"
| colspan="9" style="background:#bbcaff;"|All-Star Break

|- style="background:#fcc;"
| 8
| May 3
| Blackwater
| L 98–104
| Kevin Alas (18)
| Wayne Chism (15)
| Chism, J. Villanueva (3)
| Smart Araneta Coliseum
| 0–8
|- style="background:#fcc;"
| 9
| May 19
| San Miguel
| L 108–114
| Wayne Chism (22)
| Alas, Al-Hussaini, Mallari (7)
| Kevin Alas (6)
| Cuneta Astrodome
| 0–9
|- style="background:#cfc;"
| 10
| May 24
| Alaska
| W 100–92
| Wayne Chism (22)
| Alex Mallari (8)
| Monfort, Quiñahan, Tiongson (4)
| Smart Araneta Coliseum
| 1–9
|- style="background:#cfc;"
| 11
| May 27
| Phoenix
| W 116–114
| Alex Mallari (22)
| Wayne Chism (13)
| Chism, Mallari (5)
| Ynares Center
| 2–9

Governors' Cup

Eliminations

Standings

Game log

|- style="background:#cfc;"
| 1
| July 19
| Alaska
| W 112–104
| Aaron Fuller (30)
| Aaron Fuller (20)
| Alas, Rios (4)
| Smart Araneta Coliseum
| 1–0
|- style="background:#cfc;"
| 2
| July 22
| Kia
| W 100–93
| Aaron Fuller (24)
| Aaron Fuller (19)
| Larry Fonacier (4)
| Smart Araneta Coliseum
| 2–0
|- style="background:#cfc;"
| 3
| July 26
| Rain or Shine
| W 122–114 (2OT)
| Aaron Fuller (33)
| Aaron Fuller (20)
| Larry Fonacier (7)
| Smart Araneta Coliseum
| 3–0
|- style="background:#cfc;"
| 4
| July 30
| Phoenix
| W 95–91
| Aaron Fuller (18)
| Aaron Fuller (24)
| Fonacier, Mallari (3)
| Smart Araneta Coliseum
| 4–0

|- style="background:#fcc;"
| 5
| August 5
| Barangay Ginebra
| L 97–110
| Aaron Fuller (20)
| Aaron Fuller (17)
| Alex Mallari (6)
| Calasiao Sports Complex
| 4–1
|- style="background:#cfc;"
| 6
| August 13
| Meralco
| W 100–94
| Aaron Fuller (25)
| Aaron Fuller (18)
| Kevin Alas (4)
| Mall of Asia Arena
| 5–1
|- style="background:#fcc;"
| 7
| August 18
| Blackwater
| L 106–107
| Kevin Alas (19)
| Alas, Fuller (11)
| Larry Fonacier (4)
| Smart Araneta Coliseum
| 5–2
|- style="background:#cfc;"
| 8
| August 27
| San Miguel
| W 103–100
| Aaron Fuller (26)
| Aaron Fuller (22)
| Alex Mallari (5)
| Smart Araneta Coliseum
| 6–2

|- style="background:#cfc;"
| 9
| September 3
| GlobalPort
| W 109–99
| Aaron Fuller (33)
| Aaron Fuller (20)
| Cyrus Baguio (5)
| Smart Araneta Coliseum
| 7–2
|- style="background:#fcc;"
| 10
| September 13
| TNT
| L 107–112
| Aaron Fuller (28)
| Aaron Fuller (18)
| Alas, Mallari (5)
| Ynares Center
| 7–3
|- style="background:#fcc;" 
| 11
| September 24
| Star
| L 93–101
| Aaron Fuller (16)
| Aaron Fuller (17)
| Alas, Mallari (4)
| Smart Araneta Coliseum 
| 7–4

Playoffs

Bracket

Game log

|- style="background:#fcc;"
| 1
| September 26
| Star
| L 77–89
| Aaron Fuller (16)
| Aaron Fuller (9)
| Larry Fonacier (4)
| Mall of Asia Arena
| 0–1

Transactions

Trades

Commissioner's Cup

Recruited imports

Awards

References

NLEX Road Warriors seasons
NLEX Road Warriors season